The 2020–21 NISA season was the second season of the National Independent Soccer Association's third-division soccer competition. The regular season was split into two halves, Fall and Spring, with playoffs at the end of each, and a Championship Match that had the Fall champion host the Spring champion. This season also saw the introduction of a new cup competition, the NISA Independent Cup, that features independent clubs from various professional and semi-professional leagues across the United States.

Teams
The eight teams that participated in the inaugural 2019-20 NISA season were joined by three expansion teams: New York Cosmos and New Amsterdam FC for the full season. Two of the existing teams, San Diego 1904 and Stumptown Athletic, announced that they will not participate in the Fall season, but intend to return for the Spring season. On October 13, it was announced that Maryland Bobcats FC had been accepted into the league with the plan of starting play in Spring of 2021. The team had been taking part in the Mid-Atlantic region of the NISA Independent Cup and won the group following this announcement. On November 6, New Jersey Teamsterz FC announced that they were not joining for the Spring 2021 season, despite initially being included in the Spring 2021 competitors. Citing the on-going pandemic, they clarified they were joining the lower tiers of NISA in preparation for joining in Fall of 2021.

Stadiums and locations

Personnel and sponsorship
''Note: The league has signed a deal with Hummel to be the official kit manufacturer, but it still allows clubs to find their own provider.

Managerial changes

NISA Independent Cup
Following the cancellation of the 2020 Spring Season on April 27, 2020 due to the COVID-19 pandemic, NISA announced initial Fall 2020 season plans and the creation of a new tournament called the NISA Independent Cup. The region-based competition would include NISA clubs, including new expansion sides the New York Cosmos and New Amsterdam FC, and both independent professional and high quality amateur teams.

On July 1, NISA officially announced the cup along with the 15 teams that would be participating. In total, four member clubs took part with the rest of the field consisting of teams from the National Premier Soccer League, United Premier Soccer League, and Gulf Coast Premier League. The participants were split into four geographical regions with each operating independently and making decisions (format, tiebreaker rules, fan attendance policies, etc.) autonomously. All games were live streamed online through MyCujoo, with some also being broadcast on local television.

The Great Lakes Division also served as a rekindling of the Rust Belt Derby, a former in-season competition previously held in the NPSL, with 2019 NPSL national semifinalist Cleveland SC taking the place of the now folded AFC Cleveland.

Central Plains Region
The four teams were split into pairs before playing two games against one-another. If tied on aggregate after two games, with no away goal rule, teams would play two 10-minute overtime periods followed by a penalty kick shootout if necessary. Winner of each aggregate competition meet in the Championship match.

Both matches between Louisiana Krewe and Gaffa were played at Holden Stadium on the campus of Pearl River Community College in Poplarville, Mississippi.

Lone Star Republic hosted the first game against Mansfield Revolution at Greenhill School in Addison, Texas. The Revolution hosted the second at Mansfield Summit High School in Arlington, Texas.

Semifinals

|}

Final

Great Lakes Region
The three teams competed in a Round-robin competition, each playing a total of two games. Any games tied after 90 minutes were set to be decided by a penalty kick shootout. Both games involving Detroit City took place at Keyworth Stadium in Hamtramck, Michigan. The remaining match between Cleveland and Buffalo was played at Erie Veterans Memorial Stadium in Erie, Pennsylvania.

The Great Lakes Champion was determined by most points, followed by head-to head, followed by goal differential.

Standings

Results

Mid-Atlantic Region
The four teams completed in a round-robin competition, playing a total of three games each. The Mid-Atlantic Champion was determined by most points, followed by head-to head, followed by goal differential.

All games were originally going to be hosted by the Bobcats at the Maryland SoccerPlex in Germantown, Maryland behind closed doors. On July 24, NISA announced that region's tournament was postponed due to a surge of COVID-19 cases in Maryland and the subsequent closing of Maryland SoccerPlex to professional sports. On July 28, NISA announced that five of the region's six games would be played at Evergreen Sportsplex in Leesburg, Virginia, with the August 2 match between New Amsterdam and the Cosmos being played at Hudson Sports Complex in Warwick, New York.

The Thursday, August 6 match between New Amsterdam and Maryland Bobcats was called off mid-way through the first half due to inclement weather, with the following match between the Cosmos and Baltimore postponed. On August 22, NISA announced the first make-up date with New Amsterdam taking on Maryland on Sunday, August 23 at YSC Sports Complex in Wayne, Pennsylvania. The second make-up was announced on September 25 with the Cosmos hosting Baltimore at Mitchel Athletic Complex in Uniondale, New York on Saturday, October 10.

Standings

Results

Southeast Region
The four teams competed in a round-robin competition against one-another in various venues in Georgia, South Carolina, and Tennessee.

Both Finley Stadium in Chattanooga, Tennessee and Memorial Stadium in Columbia, South Carolina hosted matches the first two weeks. The final group stage round that was set to be played at Columbia International University in Columbia, South Carolina on July 25 was called off due to weather. The Southeast Regional Champion will now be determined by group stage points instead of the originally scheduled championship final and third place match, with the final set of games moved to Finley Stadium on August 1.

Standings

Results

Fall season

On June 4, NISA announced the Fall season format. The season would be split into two separate formats: a regionalized regular season commencing in August, dividing the eight member teams into two conferences; Eastern and Western, followed by a single location tournament in late October that would determine a Fall Season champion.

Following the Shooting of Jacob Blake on August 23, the three league matches scheduled for the weekend of August 29 were postponed in protest of racial injustice. The games were rescheduled for later dates.

Eastern Conference

Standings

Results

Western Conference

Standings

Results

Playoffs
All 8 teams competed in the 2020 Fall tournament, which happened from September 21 to October 2, at Keyworth Stadium, in Hamtramack. The teams were split into two groups of four, based on their regular season records, with the top two teams in each group advancing to the semifinals. The winner of the Fall tournament will host the winner of the Spring season in the inaugural NISA Championship match.

Group stage

Group A

Group B

Knock-Out Round

Semifinals

NISA Fall Championship

Player statistics

Top goalscorers

Clean sheets

Spring season
The league saw an increase in the number of teams compared to the Fall season, with both San Diego 1904 FC and Stumptown Athletic returning from hiatus, and Maryland Bobcats FC joining as an expansion team. Meanwhile, Oakland Roots SC left the league in order to take part in USL Championship and the New York Cosmos went on hiatus due to the COVID-19 pandemic.

The Spring season started on April 13, 2021, with a bubble tournament named the NISA Legends Cup and hosted by Chattanooga FC, with the winner gaining entry into the Spring 2021 Final. Phase 2 began on May 1, 2021 and was a traditional regular season hosted in each team's markets. The highest finishing team in the table will face the winner of the Legends Cup in the Spring 2021 Final to determine the Spring champion.

NISA Legends Cup 
The 9 teams were split into three groups of three teams. The best team at the end of the group stage qualified directly to the Legends Cup final, while the second and third seeds played a semifinal game to determine the second finalist.

Group 1

Group 2

Group 3

Overall Standings

Knock-Out Round

Other Matches 

|}

Phase 2

Standings

Results

Player statistics

Top goalscorers

Clean sheets

Playoffs 
Originally, the NISA Legends Cup champion and the highest finishing team in Phase 2 were scheduled to play in the 2021 NISA Spring Championship at Keyworth Stadium on June 30 with the winner advancing to the 2020–21 Season Championship match three days later. However, since Detroit City FC won the Legends Cup and finished atop the Spring table the match simply became a semifinal between the runners-up of each competition.

Championship match 
Detroit City FC, the winner of the Fall season, hosted semifinal winner Los Angeles Force in the inaugural NISA Championship match on July 3, 2021.

Notes

See also 
 National Independent Soccer Association

References

External links 
 NISA official website

2020-21
2020 in American soccer leagues
2021 in American soccer leagues
Impact of the COVID-19 pandemic on sports